The 1969-70 NBA season was the Bulls' 4th season in the NBA.

Offseason

Draft picks

Roster

Regular season

Season standings

Record vs. opponents

Game log

Playoffs

|- align="center" bgcolor="#ffcccc"
| 1
| March 25
| @ Atlanta
| L 111–129
| Chet Walker (17)
| Tom Boerwinkle (11)
| Haskins, Weiss (6)
| Alexander Memorial Coliseum6,427
| 0–1
|- align="center" bgcolor="#ffcccc"
| 2
| March 28
| @ Atlanta
| L 104–124
| Tom Boerwinkle (23)
| Tom Boerwinkle (12)
| Boerwinkle, Weiss (4)
| Alexander Memorial Coliseum7,195
| 0–2
|- align="center" bgcolor="#ffcccc"
| 3
| March 31
| Atlanta
| L 101–106
| Shaler Halimon (22)
| Tom Boerwinkle (18)
| Shaler Halimon (6)
| Chicago Stadium8,898
| 0–3
|- align="center" bgcolor="#ccffcc"
| 4
| April 3
| Atlanta
| W 131–120
| Chet Walker (39)
| Sloan, Boerwinkle (12)
| Clem Haskins (13)
| Chicago Stadium7,584
| 1–3
|- align="center" bgcolor="#ffcccc"
| 5
| April 5
| @ Atlanta
| L 107–113
| Clem Haskins (22)
| Tom Boerwinkle (19)
| Clem Haskins (6)
| Alexander Memorial Coliseum4,966
| 1–4
|-

Awards and records
Jerry Sloan, NBA All-Defensive Second Team
Chet Walker, NBA All-Star Game

References

Chicago Bulls seasons
Chicago
Chicago Bulls
Chicago Bulls